Comics Literacy Awareness (CLAw) is a national organization in the United Kingdom promoting literacy through comic books.

Founded in 2014, it is a registered charity under English law and its mission is to raise the literacy levels of UK children through the medium of comics and graphic novels.

CLAw organizes the UK's Comics Laureate, on the model of the Children's Laureate, to act as an ambassador for comic books and their potential to improve literacy. The first Comics Laureate, Dave Gibbons, was selected in October 2014.

See also

 Kate Greenaway Medal
 List of comics awards

References

External links
 
 

British children's literature
2014 establishments in the United Kingdom
Educational charities based in the United Kingdom
Organizations established in 2014
Comics awards